Stenoptilia mimula is a moth of the family Pterophoridae. It is found in Spain, France and Italy.

References

mimula
Moths described in 1985
Plume moths of Europe